Calydon is a genus of beetles in the family Cerambycidae, containing the following species:

 Calydon globithorax (Fairmaire & Germain, 1861)
 Calydon submetallicum (Blanchard in Gay, 1851)

References

Callidiini